Storozhevoy was the lead ship of her class (officially known as Project 7U) of 18 destroyers built for the Soviet Navy during the late 1930s. Although she began construction as a Project 7 , Storozhevoy was completed in 1940 to the modified Project 7U design.

Serving with the Baltic Fleet, her bow was blown off by a German torpedo a few days after the start of the German invasion of the Soviet Union (Operation Barbarossa) in June 1941. Although her crew suffered heavy losses, the aft part of the ship remained afloat and was towed to Soviet naval bases, ultimately being repaired during the Siege of Leningrad by the fitting of a bow from an unfinished Project 30 destroyer from late 1942 to early 1943. Returning to service in September of the latter year, Storozhevoy bombarded Axis positions during the final months of the siege. Postwar, she continued to serve in the Baltic and was briefly converted to a training ship before being scrapped in the late 1950s.

Design 

Originally built as a Gnevny-class ship, Strashny and her sister ships were completed to the modified Project 7U design after Joseph Stalin, General Secretary of the Communist Party of the Soviet Union, ordered that the latter be built with their boilers arranged en echelon, instead of linked as in the Gnevnys, so that a ship could still move with one or two boilers disabled.

The crew complement of the Storozhevoy class numbered 207 in peacetime, but this increased to 271 in wartime, as more personnel were needed to operate additional equipment. Each ship had a pair of geared steam turbines, each driving one propeller, rated to produce  using steam from four water-tube boilers, which the designers expected would exceed the  speed of the Project 7s because there was additional steam available. Storozhevoy herself reached  during her sea trials in 1941.

The Project 7U-class ships mounted four  B-13 guns in two pairs of superfiring single mounts fore and aft of the superstructure. Anti-aircraft defense was provided by a pair of  34-K AA guns in single mounts and three  21-K AA guns, as well as four  DK or DShK machine guns. They carried six  torpedo tubes in two rotating triple mounts amidships. The ships could also carry a maximum of 58 to 96 mines and 30 depth charges.

Modifications 
The new bow fitted onto Storozhevoy included the twin 130 mm BL-2M turret of the Project 30 ships, with a supply of 744 rounds. Her 45 mm anti-aircraft guns were replaced with six newer  (70-K) AA guns, while the remainder of her armament remained the same. After the war, all of her AA guns were replaced by eight water-cooled V-11M versions of the 70-K gun in twin mounts.

Construction and career 
Storozhevoy was laid down in Shipyard No. 190 (Zhdanov) in Leningrad with the yard number 517 on 26 August 1936 as a Gnevny-class destroyer. She was relaid down as the first Project 7U destroyer during January 1938, and launched on 2 October of that year. Although she was officially accepted on 6 October 1940, she did not officially join the Baltic Fleet until 12 April 1941, when the Soviet naval jack was raised aboard her. With the 2nd Destroyer Division of the fleet's Light Forces Detachment, she was transferred from Riga to Ust-Dvinsk, Latvia, on 14 June 1941, a week before the beginning of Operation Barbarossa, the German invasion of the Soviet Union.

During the first days after Operation Barbarossa began, Storozhevoy was tasked with laying defensive minefields, conducting her first such operation on 24 June in the Irbe Strait. After reaching the strait, she was attacked off the Mikhailovsky shoals by five German E-boats of the 3rd Flotilla at 02:27 on 27 June. A torpedo launched by either S-59 or S-31 struck the left side of the ship near the forward magazine; the resulting explosion blew off her bow with its superstructure and the foremast. The latter sank instantly, while the forward boiler room and front stack were heavily damaged. 84 crewmen and her commander, Kapitan 3-go ranga (Captain 3rd Rank) I.F. Lomakin, were killed. Having failed to spot the E-boats, the Soviets believed that the attack was made by a submarine.

The crew managed to keep the aft portion of the destroyer afloat, controlling the flooding and keeping the steam turbines and three boilers operational. At 16:00 it was taken under tow by Engels, which was later relieved by other ships. In several stages, she was towed to Tallinn and thence to Kronstadt, where she was drydocked on 7 July. During the following months, the heavily damaged parts of the ship were removed and her forward-most remaining bulkhead reinforced. After being transferred to Leningrad on 20 November, further repairs were prevented by the siege of the city and she remained mothballed until August 1942. The ship was hit once each on 23 and 24 April by German artillery with little effect. On 24 May her aft funnel was hit by a German artillery shell, causing damage to her turbines among other machinery. Transferred to Shipyard No. 190 on 15 July 1942 as a new bow could not be manufactured due to the siege, she was fitted with the bow of the unfinished Project 30 destroyer Organizovanny. After the completion of the repairs on 1 May 1943, the destroyer returned to service on 10 September following trials. Her further combat service was limited to shelling Axis positions in support of ground forces during the Siege of Leningrad.

Postwar, between 25 February 1946 and 4 January 1956, she was part of the 4th Fleet after the Baltic Fleet was divided. On 17 February of the latter year Storozhevoy was removed from the combat fleet and reclassified as a training destroyer. Her crew was disbanded on 28 January 1958 and on 11 March she was removed from the fleet to be transferred for scrapping, which was carried out by Glavvtorchermet between 1958 and 1959 at Liepāja.

Citations

Sources

Further reading

External links
  Storozhevoy photographs on navsource.narod.ru

Storozhevoy-class destroyers
1938 ships
Ships built at Severnaya Verf
Cold War destroyers of the Soviet Union